Don Anselmo Bernad Avenue, commonly referred to by its acronym DABA, is a major road in Ozamiz, Misamis Occidental. Several banks and commercial establishments were located, making this avenue as one of the busiest roads in Ozamiz. It is part of Ozamiz–Oroquieta Road, which intersects with Ozamiz–Pagadian Road. Named after Don Anselmo Bernad, former mayor of Misamis town and former governor of Misamis Occidental. Formerly known as the Don Mariano Marcos Avenue.

Landmarks

Banks
 1st Valley Bank Ozamiz-Bernad
Banco Dipolog Ozamiz
Eastwest Bank Ozamiz
First Consolidated Bank Ozamiz
 Land Bank of the Philippines Ozamiz
Panguil Bay Rural Bank of Ozamiz
PenBank Ozamiz
 Philippine Business Bank Ozamiz
Rizal Commercial Banking Corporation Ozamiz
 Robinson's Bank Ozamiz
Rural Bank of Rizal Ozamiz

Government Centers
 Ozamiz City Hall / Mayor Fernando T. Bernad Memorial Hall
Social Security System Ozamiz

Parks

 Prospera Park

Restaurants/Fast-foods and Hotels

 Bo's Coffee Ozamiz
Chowking Drive-Thru Ozamiz Bernad
Greenwich Ozamiz
 Jollibee Drive-Thru Ozamiz Bernad
 New Central Restaurant
 McDonald's Drive-Thru Ozamiz Bernad

Other Notable Buildings
 PLDT Ozamiz
 Insular Building
 Gloria Bazaar
 St. Peter's Chapel
 Gov. Angel Medina Memorial Gymnasium
 TE Petron Service Center
 Suzuki Auto Ozamiz
 Toyota Ozamiz Satellite Office
 Kia Motors Ozamiz
 Sony Service Center Office Ozamiz
 Goldsquare Ozamiz
 PUREGOLD Ozamiz

References

Ozamiz
Roads in Misamis Occidental